Al-Jadam is a sub-district located in Maswar District, 'Amran Governorate, Yemen. Al-Jadam had a population of 4072 according to the 2004 census.

References 

Sub-districts in Maswar District